James Monroe Pendleton (January 10, 1822 – February 16, 1889) was a U.S. Representative from Rhode Island.

Biography
Born in North Stonington, Connecticut, Pendleton attended school in North Stonington and Suffield, Connecticut.
He moved to Westerly, Rhode Island, and engaged in mercantile pursuits and later in the insurance business and banking.
He served in the State senate 1862-1865.
He served as delegate to the Republican National Convention in 1868.

Pendleton was elected as a Republican to the Forty-second and Forty-third Congresses (March 4, 1871 – March 3, 1875).
He was an unsuccessful candidate for reelection in 1874 to the Forty-fourth Congress.
He served as member of the State house of representatives 1879-1884.
He served as chairman of the State board of charities and corrections 1884-1889.
He died in Westerly, Rhode Island, February 16, 1889.
He was interred in River Bend Cemetery.

References

External links 
 

1822 births
1889 deaths
People from Westerly, Rhode Island
People from North Stonington, Connecticut
Republican Party members of the United States House of Representatives from Rhode Island
Republican Party members of the Rhode Island House of Representatives
19th-century American politicians
Republican Party Rhode Island state senators